Ujiyarpur Lok Sabha constituency is one of the 40 Lok Sabha (parliamentary) constituencies in Bihar state in eastern India. This constituency came into existence in 2008, following delimitation of the parliamentary constituencies based on the recommendations of the Delimitation Commission of India.

Caste and Communities
The Ujiarpur constituency has nearly 2.5 lakh  Yadav, 2.5 lakh Koeri, followed by  1.5 lakh Rajput voters. The Constituency was once won by Alok Kumar Mehta in 2004 but he lost to Ashwamedh Devi, the widow of veteran Koeri leader Pradip Mahto in 2009. Nityanand Rai of Bhartiya Janata Party is representing the seat since 2014.

Vidhan Sabha segments
From the 2009 Lok Sabha elections, Ujiarpur Lok Sabha constituency comprises six Vidhan Sabha (legislative assembly) segments, which are:

Members of Parliament

Election Results

2019

2014

2009

References

Lok Sabha constituencies in Bihar
Politics of Samastipur district
Politics of Vaishali district